This is a list of Estonian television related events from 1962.

Events

Debuts
 December – concert film "Laulab Georg Ots" was finished. The film was directed by Artur Rinne.

Television shows

Ending this year

Births

Deaths

See also
 1962 in Estonia

References

1960s in Estonian television